Sean Manuel (born December 1, 1973) is a former American football tight end. He played in the National Football League (NFL) for the San Francisco 49ers in 1996 and in the XFL for the San Francisco Demons in 2001.

References

1973 births
Living people
American football tight ends
New Mexico State Aggies football players
San Francisco 49ers players
London Monarchs players
San Francisco Demons players